Helpfau-Uttendorf is a municipality in the district of Braunau am Inn in the Austrian state of Upper Austria.

Geography
About 26 percent of the municipality is forest and 62 percent farmland.

References

Cities and towns in Braunau am Inn District